Wuping is a town of Zhugqu County, Gansu, China. , it has 9 villages under its administration.

References

Township-level divisions of Gansu
Zhugqu County